John Moffet (April 5, 1831 – June 19, 1884) was a Democratic member-elect of the U.S. House of Representatives from Pennsylvania.

John Moffet was born in County Antrim, Ireland.  He immigrated to the United States with his parents, who settled in Philadelphia.  He studied medicine in the University of Pennsylvania there and became an apothecary in 1853.

He presented credentials as a Democratic Member-elect to the Forty-first Congress and served only one month until he was succeeded by Leonard Myers, who had contested his election (March 4, 1869 – April 9, 1869).

He died on June 19, 1884, in Philadelphia and was interred at Laurel Hill Cemetery.

References

Sources

The Political Graveyard

1831 births
1884 deaths
Perelman School of Medicine at the University of Pennsylvania alumni
Irish emigrants to the United States (before 1923)
Politicians from Philadelphia
Democratic Party members of the United States House of Representatives from Pennsylvania
Burials at Laurel Hill Cemetery (Philadelphia)
19th-century American politicians